Lee Thomas Autry II (born July 29, 1996) is a professional Canadian football defensive lineman who is currently a free agent. He was most recently a member of the Hamilton Tiger-Cats of the Canadian Football League (CFL). Autry has also been a member of the Chicago Bears, Los Angeles Chargers and Las Vegas Raiders.

College career
Autry first played college football for the Itawamba Community College Indians from 2015 to 2016. He then transferred to play for the Mississippi State Bulldogs where he had a redshirt season in 2017 and then played from 2018 to 2019. With the Bulldogs, he appeared in 18 games where he had 23 total tackles, 2.5 tackles for a loss, and 0.5 sacks.

Professional career

Chicago Bears
After going unselected in the 2020 NFL Draft, Autry signed with the Chicago Bears on May 8, 2020. However, he was released soon after the season started on September 8, 2020.

Los Angeles Chargers
On October 8, 2020, Autry signed a practice roster agreement with the Los Angeles Chargers. He was later released on October 28, 2020.

Las Vegas Raiders
Autry was signed by the Las Vegas Raiders to their practice squad on December 10, 2020, but was released four days later on December 14, 2020.

Hamilton Tiger-Cats
Autry was signed by the Hamilton Tiger-Cats on June 28, 2021. He began the 2021 season on the practice roster but was promoted to the team's active roster in Week 2 and made his professional debut on August 14, 2021, against the Saskatchewan Roughriders. Autry played in four regular season games for the Tiger-Cats in 2021 and also played in the East Semi-Final and 108th Grey Cup. Autry has spent most of the 2022 season on the Ticats’ practice roster, dressing for two games, recording two tackles. Autry was released by the Ti-Cats on October 6, 2022, near the end of the regular season.

Personal life
Autry was born in Albemarle, North Carolina to parents Lasonya and Lee Autry. His brother, Denico Autry, also plays gridiron football professionally as a defensive lineman and is a member of the Tennessee Titans.

References

External links
Hamilton Tiger-Cats bio

1996 births
Living people
American football defensive linemen
Canadian football defensive linemen
Chicago Bears players
Hamilton Tiger-Cats players
Las Vegas Raiders players
Los Angeles Chargers players
Mississippi State Bulldogs football players
People from Albemarle, North Carolina
Players of American football from North Carolina